Dweller is a 2002 low budget horror film by the Polonia Brothers. It was released in 2004 on the Brentwood 4-pack Sleazy Slashers, which also included the Polonias' Night Thirst.

The film concerns three ruthless bank robbers, played by John Polonia, Mark Polonia and Jon McBride ('Cannibal Campout', 'Woodchipper Massacre'), who camp out in an area where an alien spacecraft has landed, with low budget carnage ensuing.

References

External links
 
 Review at Answers.com

2002 horror films
American science fiction horror films
2002 films
2000s science fiction horror films
Films directed by Mark Polonia
2000s English-language films
2000s American films